Luis Alejandro Luna Quinteros (born January 25, 1988) is an Ecuadorian footballer who plays as a centre back or defensive midfielder for L.D.U. Portoviejo.

References

External links
FEF card 

1988 births
Living people
Sportspeople from Guayaquil
Association football defenders
Ecuadorian footballers
S.D. Aucas footballers
Imbabura S.C. footballers
L.D.U. Quito footballers
C.D. El Nacional footballers
Fuerza Amarilla S.C. footballers
Delfín S.C. footballers
Independiente Medellín footballers
C.D. Cuenca footballers
Guayaquil City F.C. footballers
L.D.U. Portoviejo footballers
Ecuadorian Serie A players